The Blackout is a 2019 Russian science fiction action thriller film directed by Egor Baranov and starring Pyotr Fyodorov. It had its world premiere at the Cinequest Film & Creativity Festival on 15 March 2019 and was released in the Russian Federation on 21 November 2019. The film is about an event that suddenly plunges the entire world into darkness, rapidly destroying life on Earth except for a small area in Eastern Europe. It received generally negative reviews from film critics.

Plot

Prologue 
When an alarm is triggered at the "Outpost" military base, soldiers take up positions and prepare for battle. It is reported that an unidentified enemy is approaching, creatures larger than humans moving at a speed of twenty kilometers per hour.

A month earlier 
24 days before the events of the Prologue, serviceman Oleg has a date with Alena. Later they go back to his place. Suddenly the entire world, except for the area around Moscow, and parts of Belarus, Ukraine and Finland is plunged into darkness. The fate of billions is unknown. Communications are down throughout the rest of the world, and only a small number of people have survived in the area that becomes known as the Circle of Life. A defensive perimeter is established and reconnaissance groups are sent out but do not return. They find that there was an attack on Earth, leaving unknown numbers dead. To defend against the mysterious enemy, the humans mobilize an army, and outposts are built. After leaving the Circle of Life to conduct a reconnaissance operation, a squad sweeps the dead cities outside and a soldier is attacked and wounded, The other soldiers try to shoot the stranger, but he escapes.

Outpost protection 
The action goes back to the prologue. While preparing for an unknown enemy, electricity is turned off and the outpost is plunged into darkness. After being informed that creatures bigger than humans are emerging from the forest at 20 km per hour, they begin to fire, while discovering that the enemy is in fact a massive herd of brown bears. The next morning, not all soldiers had survived. Among the survivors is Oleg, whose leg was injured. In Moscow it is revealed some survivors from the edge of the Quarantine zone now have “abilities”, one of these people Sasha appears to have a psychic connection to the unknown attackers. A strange figure calling himself Eid comes to the patient Sasha and asks for his help, since Sasha’s Psychic link can locate Eid’s brother Ra, who is behind all this. Four soldiers, led by Marina, train their weapons at Eid, but the latter, with the help of supernormal abilities, turns the soldiers' weapons at Marina and suggests that he explain everything to them if they save his life. During interrogation, Eid explains that he is an alien from a distant star system that has long died out. They want to move to Earth, because in their constellation the star “Sun” is still young and will live long enough, Ra is behind all this, although before that Eid thought he was the only one on Earth. He arrived on Earth another two hundred thousand years ago, which means that according to his calculations, the ship with their army will be here tomorrow. The problem is that he does not know where Ra is hiding, which controls the minds of ordinary people outside the “circle of life” but the only one who knows where to find him is Sasha. Eid penetrates Sasha’s head, and he finds out that Ra is on the roof of a skyscraper in Kirov. At that moment Ra himself looked at Sasha and realized that he had been found. Eid decided to leave Sasha at the outpost, and Ra at that time ordered people to launch a missile attack at the outpost. However, Eid with Zhenya and the rest of the soldiers, led by Mary, remain alive, as they had left the base to find Ra.

Losses 
At this time, Yura joins the satellite-9 group of the outpost and in the middle of the night finds a young boy in one of the apartments. However, during while questioned by Lieutenant Maxim about what happened, the boy suddenly draws a knife from Maxim's pants and kills him; in retaliation, the boy is shot dead by the other soldiers. A whole crowd of people then begins to attack the group under the control of Ra and only Yura and Olya remain alive. They hijack one of the abandoned cars and drive back to the outpost. 
On the way, they meet the surviving outpost soldiers led by Marina and Major Dovlatov, from whom they learn that the outpost was destroyed by a massive missile strike. Eid explains that if Zhenya went with them, Ra would have killed them otherwise, and the outpost would have left him alone. Gathered together, they go back to Kirov, encountering a crowd of people under the control of Ra, fight through a skyscraper, climb the roof and find Ra. Eid and Ra Engage in battle and eventually Eid tears out a device from Ra’s chest, Allowing Yura to thrust a grenade into Ra’s chest, killing him. 
After Ra's death, Eid sends out a telepathic pulse that kills all the remaining drones, making them instantly collapse.
Osmolovskaya asks Eid what they will do next. Eid replies that they will do what they were created to do; kill.

Eid continues that in the past, humans evolved to such a degree that they became a threat even to the aliens. Ra, concerned over this, then created a religion for humanity based on love, hoping that it would keep humanity in a perpetual state of love and peacefulness. Instead, humans turned religion into a reason for more conflict and violence. Eid then orders the survivors to kill the colonizers when the ship has landed.

Upset hearing all this, Zhenya asks Eid why he did not arrive sooner before the death 8 billion people, to which Eid replies that doing so would have disrupted the plan and triggered the arriving ship into defensive mode. He then reveals his plan; the survivors killing the colonizers and then restarting civilization with Eid as their god.
Zhenya exclaims that Eid is not God but the Devil, to which Eid replies that he is the god they deserve.

Furious, Oleg confronts Eid, but Yura defends him, saying that Eid is their only chance of survival. Zhenya then lunges at Eid and stabs him with a knife, before realizing that he in reality mortally stabbed Osmolovskaya who Eid made appear as him by using his psychic powers.
Oleg and Yura starts to fight, when Olya suddenly shoots Yura, wounding him. Oleg then shoots Eid, who responds by creating multiple illusions of himself as Oleg's father to distract him. 
However, Zhenya seizes the moment and lunges at the real Eid, throwing himself and Eid from the roof, killing them both.

Invasion 
An alien ship descends from the sky, next to a skyscraper, and a hatch opens. However, the aliens for some reason do not go out. Alena, Olya and Oleg decide to enter the alien ship while the injured Yura shouts in their backs “We will die all the same!” Entering the ship, they find out that all the aliens are still sleeping in cryocapsules and have not woken up. Countdown timers turn on at cryocapsules, and the three main characters decide to break the pipes for oxygen supply, thereby killing them in the capsules themselves, leaving them to die without oxygen. When it remains to destroy the last tube, it turns out that it delivers oxygen to the capsules with the aliens' children, and they decide not to break it. The capsule timers reach zero, the capsules open, and alien children crawl out of their capsules. They see three representatives of planet Earth in front of them. The latter voluntarily throw their weapons on the floor in front of their eyes, proving that they will not harm them.

Cast
 Kseniya Kutepova as Osmolovskaya
 Svetlana Ivanova as Olya	
 Pyotr Fyodorov as Yura
 Konstantin Lavronenko as Mayor Dolmatov
 Aleksey Chadov as Oleg
 Lukerya Ilyashenko as Alena
 Filipp Avdeyev as Zhenya
 Ilya Volkov as Ra
 Artyom Tkachenko as Eid
 Sergey Godin as Lavrin
 Anastasiya Venkova
 Aleksandr Nedorezov as Spetsnazovets
 Angelina Strechina as Katia

Production 
Initially, the film was conceived as a series, but the creators had only the script of the first series. When this series was filmed, Egor Baranov made some changes to the history. After the first series was shot, it became clear that the changes in the script slightly change the intonation and direction of the plot. After that, it was decided to move the script in a slightly different direction. Baranov claims that his film is more anti-war, since he did not try to show the strength of the military, in contrast to films like Transformers and Top Gun. In the film, about 70% of the total timing is done using computer graphics.

Filming 
According to Baranov, they worked on the filming of the full film for about six months, and sometimes about a year. On the set of the film, real soldiers with the latest military equipment were involved, who agreed to star in this film, offering only small tips and advice for scenes with their participation. At the same time, the military themselves did not interfere in the script of the film. Filming was completed in May 2019.

Music 
Released as a part of the film's official soundtrack, the song "fine" was released by American musician Mike Shinoda on 31 October 2019. Shinoda has also released a music video for the song on 3 December, which includes scenes from the film.

Release 
The film had its world premiere at the Cinequest Film & Creativity Festival in San Jose, California, on 15 March 2019. Its release in Russia took place on 21 November 2019, and on 26 November it was announced that the film would also be released in the USA and in two dozen other foreign countries. It was released on VOD as The Blackout: Invasion Earth by Shout! Factory on 29 May 2020.

Marketing 
The film was presented by Premier Studios at Comic-Con Russia 2019 along with the film Caramora and the film adaptation of Metro 2033. The Blackout is the only film from Russia included in the program of the American festival Cinequest, combining cinema and high technology. On 20 August 2019, Mir Fantastiki magazine acted as the media partner of this film. On 23 October 2019, the filmmakers, together with Premier Studios, together with MY.GAMES launched the Warface Special Invitational Season 2: Outpost tournament, which combines the world of Warface with this film.

Reception

Box office 
The Blackout grossed $0 in North America and $2.8 million worldwide, against a production budget of about $4 million.

Home rentals 
In the first week of rental, the film was able to collect only about 100 million rubles (≃$1.3 million) by the end of the weekend. By late November, early December, fees amounted to about 144 million rubles.

Critical response 
Stanislav Zelvensky gave the film 2.9 stars out of 10. Vladislav Shuravin of film.ru gave the film 4 stars out of 10. Pavel Voronkov, in his review of the film for Gazeta.Ru, lamented its running time as overlong, calling it "painfully, criminally, inhumanly drawn out", and wrote that "the flow of entrails and guts will tire, perhaps, even the most bloodthirsty militarist." Sergey Ageev, who wrote a review for fatcatslim.ru, praised The Blackout for its effects and action sequences, but criticized the film's script as "very, very bland", called the acting "lousy" and the plot "ridiculous".

Video game 
On 7 November 2019, a browser game was launched, the main feature of which is integration with Google Maps. In the application window, the user can enter any address (or simply indicate the city) and see how his native streets will change in the ensuing post-apocalypse in the universe of this film. Also in the game there will be elements of a shooter, since the main task in the game will be cleaning the streets from aliens.

Sequel 

The movie was re-released on October 2020 as 6-episode TV version on TV-3 channel. For more information visit The Movie DB.

References

External links 
  (in Russian)
 
 

2019 films
2010s Russian-language films
2019 action thriller films
2010s science fiction thriller films
Russian science fiction thriller films
Russian science fiction action films
2019 science fiction action films
Russian action thriller films
Russian post-apocalyptic films
Russian dystopian films
2010s dystopian films
Anti-war films
Cyberpunk films